The Heinlein Prize for Advances in Space Commercialization, generally known as the Heinlein Prize, was founded in 1988 to reward individuals who make practical contributions to the commercialization of space. The Heinlein Prize offers a cash award of $500,000 to one or more individuals for practical accomplishments in the field of commercial space activities awarded by the Heinlein Prize Trust.

Trustees for the award emphasize that the prize, which will be given as often as annually, is for effort by an individual or group of people, not government or corporate sponsored activities, and is intended to be worldwide in scope. The prize is awarded in July.

The Heinlein Prize honors the memory of Robert A. Heinlein, one of the most popular science fiction writers of the 20th century. The trust was established soon after his death in 1988 by his widow, Virginia Gerstenfeld Heinlein, whose estate will fund the prize.

Winners
Source: Heinlein Prize Trust

2006 - Peter Diamandis, for  accomplishments in commercial space activities

2011 - Elon Musk, for advances in space commercialization

2016 - Jeff Bezos, for his vision and leadership in commercial space activities that have led to historic firsts and reusability in the commercial spaceflight industry

See also

 List of space technology awards
 Private spaceflight

References

External links
Heinlein Prize Home

Awards established in 1988
Space-related awards